Frank Peter Seminara (born May 16, 1967) is an American former Major League Baseball pitcher. He threw and batted right-handed.

Seminara graduated from Columbia College of Columbia University in 1989. He currently works as managing director at Morgan Stanley Private Wealth Management. He has been ranked #1 on Forbes's Best-In-State Wealth Advisors in North New Jersey in 2018 and 2019.

References

External links

1967 births
Living people
Columbia Lions baseball players
Baseball players from New York (state)
San Diego Padres players
New York Mets players
Oneonta Yankees players
Prince William Cannons players
Wichita Wranglers players
Rochester Red Wings players
Las Vegas Stars (baseball) players
New Orleans Zephyrs players
Norfolk Tides players
Sportspeople from Brooklyn
Baseball players from New York City
Columbia College (New York) alumni
Xaverian High School alumni